Statistics of JSL Cup in the 1986 season.

Overview
It was contested by 27 teams, and Furukawa Electric won the championship.

Results

1st round
Furukawa Electric 4-1 Tanabe Pharmaceuticals
Fujita Industries 4-0 Osaka Gas
Yamaha Motors 3-1 Seino Transportations
Honda 9-0 Kyoto Police
Mitsubishi Motors 3-2 Mazda
Fujitsu 2-2 (PK 4–3) Toho Titanium
Nippon Kokan 1-1 (PK 3–0) Matsushita Electric
Kawasaki Steel 2-0 TDK
Toshiba 2-1 Nippon Steel
Sumitomo Metals 3-1 Toyota Motors
Yomiuri 0-2 Nissan Motors

2nd round
NTT Kansai 0-10 Furukawa Electric
Fujita Industries 3-0 Yamaha Motors
Honda 1-0 Mitsubishi Motors
Kofu 2-1 Cosmo Oil
Yanmar Diesel 3-0 Fujitsu
Nippon Kokan 2-0 Kawasaki Steel
Toshiba 2-0 Sumitomo Metals
Nissan Motors 1-0 Hitachi

Quarterfinals
Furukawa Electric 1-0 Fujita Industries
Honda 2-2 (PK 5–4) Kofu
Yanmar Diesel 2-1 Nippon Kokan
Toshiba 0-3 Nissan Motors

Semifinals
Furukawa Electric 0-0 (PK 4–3) Honda
Yanmar Diesel 1-1 Nissan Motors (PK 3–4)

Final
Furukawa Electric 4-0 Nissan Motors
Furukawa Electric won the championship

References
 

JSL Cup
League Cup